Blow It Out Your Ass It's Veruca Salt is an EP by Veruca Salt released in 1996. It followed the band's hit album American Thighs (1994). The EP contains four songs, two by Nina Gordon and two by Louise Post.

The album art shows the band dressed in toilet paper. In the liner notes, bassist Steve Lack is credited under his actual name, Stephen J. Lackiewicz.

Track listing 
 "Shimmer Like a Girl" (Nina Gordon) – 4:03
 "I'm Taking Europe with Me" (Louise Post) – 3:45
 "New York Mining Disaster 1996" (Gordon) – 4:56
 "Disinherit" (Post) – 6:25

Personnel 
 Louise Post – guitar, vocals
 Nina Gordon – guitar, vocals
 Steve Lack – bass guitar
 Jim Shapiro – drums, vocals
 Steve Albini – producer
 John Golden – mastering
 Paul Elledge – photographer

Usage in popular culture 
"Shimmer Like a Girl" is often used as the main theme song for Shimmer Women Athletes, a Chicago-based all-female wrestling promotion.

"I'm Taking Europe with Me" was featured in the closing credits for Matthew Bright's motion picture Freeway II: Confessions of a Trick Baby.

References 

1996 debut EPs
Veruca Salt albums
Albums produced by Steve Albini